Funhouse Tour: Live in Australia is a live album release by American pop singer Pink.  It was released on DVD, Blu-ray and also as a separate live album audio version. The album contains the July 17 and 18, 2009 shows from the Funhouse Tour, recorded at the Sydney Entertainment Centre in Sydney, Australia. It was released on October 14, 2009, by LaFace Records. In Australia, the release has been certified 32x Platinum.

Track listing

Charts

DVD
The DVD became the fastest selling in Australian history debuting with sales in excess of 11 times platinum. For 19 consecutive weeks it has remained at number one on the ARIA DVD chart, and has been certified 31 times platinum.

CD

Certifications

DVD

References

2009 live albums
Pink (singer) video albums
Live video albums